Jasmine Sammy is a Trinidadian former cricketer who played as an all-rounder, batting right-handed and bowling right-arm off break. She appeared in four One Day Internationals for Trinidad and Tobago at the 1973 World Cup, and six Test matches and one One Day International for the West Indies between 1976 and 1979. She also played domestic cricket for Trinidad and Tobago.

References

External links
 
 

Living people
Date of birth missing (living people)
Year of birth missing (living people)
West Indian women cricketers
West Indies women Test cricketers
West Indies women One Day International cricketers
Trinidad and Tobago women cricketers